The  is a member of the cabinet of Japan and is the leader and chief executive of the Ministry of Foreign Affairs. The minister is responsible for implementing Japan’s foreign policy and is also a statutory member of the National Security Council. The minister is nominated by the Prime Minister of Japan and is appointed by the Emperor of Japan.

Since the end of the allied occupation of Japan, the position has been one of the most powerful in the cabinet, as Japan's economic interests have long relied on foreign relations. The recent efforts of former Prime Minister Junichiro Koizumi and Shinzo Abe to establish a more interventionist foreign policy have also heightened the importance of the position.

The current Minister for Foreign Affairs is Yoshimasa Hayashi, who took office on November 10, 2021.

List of Ministers for Foreign Affairs
Italics indicates subject served as Acting Foreign Minister.
Bold indicates subject served concurrently as Prime Minister for a period of time.

Empire of Japan (1885–1945)

Postwar Japan (1945–present)

See also 
 Foreign minister
 Foreign policy of Japan

References

External links 
 Minister's Profile at Ministry of Foreign Affairs website

Japan